Southern belle is a colloquialism for a debutante in the planter class of the Antebellum South.

Characteristics 
The image of a Southern belle is often characterized by fashion elements such as a hoop skirt, a corset, pantalettes, a wide-brimmed straw hat, and gloves. As signs of tanning were considered working-class and unfashionable during this era, parasols and fans are also often represented.

Southern belles were expected to marry respectable young men, and become ladies of society dedicated to the family and community. The Southern belle archetype is characterized by Southern hospitality, a cultivation of beauty, and a flirtatious yet chaste demeanor.

For example, Sallie Ward, who was born into the planter class of Kentucky in the Antebellum South, was called a Southern belle.

In popular culture 
 During the early 20th century, the release of the novel Gone with the Wind and its film adaptation popularized the image of the Southern belle, particularly in the characters Scarlett O'Hara and Melanie Wilkes.
 Southern belles have also been featured in The Birth of a Nation, A Streetcar Named Desire, The Glass Menagerie, Jezebel, The Little Foxes, The Princess and the Frog, Fried Green Tomatoes, Wacky Races, Steel Magnolias,  Sweet Home Alabama and Hart of Dixie.
 Dick Pope Sr., promoter of Florida tourism, played an important role in popularizing the archetypal image. Hostesses at his famed Cypress Gardens were portrayed as Southern belles in promotional materials for the theme park.
 Daisy Duke is the Southern belle cousin of Luke and Bo Duke in the show The Dukes of Hazzard.
 Blanche Devereaux is a Southern belle employed at an art museum in the series The Golden Girls.
 Ashton Main is a villainous Southern belle in the miniseries North and South.
 Peggy Hill is the self-proclaimed Southern belle in the Texas-based animated series King of the Hill.
 The X-Men member Rogue (aka Anna Marie) is the team's self-described Southern belle and comes from the fictitious Caldecott County, Mississippi.
 Cindy Bear is a Southern belle grizzly bear from the Hanna-Barbera animated series The Yogi Bear Show.
 In Mighty Magiswords, Penny Plasm is a Southern belle.
 In the animated series Sonic the Hedgehog and its comic book adaptations, Bunnie Rabbot, a female cyborg rabbit is a Southern belle.
 Myrtle Urkel is a rich Southern belle cousin of Steve Urkel from Family Matters.
 Floral Rugg is a Southern belle bear who is the most sophisticated member of the family in the Hanna-Barbera animated show The Hillbilly Bears.
 In the series A Different World, Whitley Gilbert-Wayne is a Southern belle.

See also 
Ringlets, a hairstyle
Scarlett O'Hara, the most famous fictional Southern belle.
Penelope Pitstop, the Southern belle racer from Wacky Races and The Perils of Penelope Pitstop.

References

External links

American upper class
Culture of the Southern United States
High society (social class)
Slang terms for women
Female stock characters